The 33rd National Basketball Association All-Star Game was played on February 13, 1983, at The Forum in Inglewood, California. The Eastern Conference defeated the Western Conference, 132–123. The Most Valuable Player was Julius Erving. Billy Cunningham coached the Eastern Conference team.  Pat Riley coached the Western Conference team.  Both would be the coaches at the following summer's NBA Finals.

The game was most notable for Marvin Gaye singing a soulful, drum machine-accompanied version of "The Star-Spangled Banner" before the game. This rendition gained newfound fame in 2008 when Nike used it in a video promoting the United States men's national basketball team.  The colors were by the Edwards Air Force Base color guard, carrying the American, California, and Air Force flags.

Rosters

Eastern Conference

Western Conference

References 

National Basketball Association All-Star Game
All-Star
Basketball competitions in Inglewood, California
1983 in sports in California